Benedikt Jónsson (born 25 November 1954, in Reykjavík) is the current Consul General of Iceland to the Faroe Islands. He has previously served as Icelandic ambassador to Russia, Armenia, Azerbaijan, Georgia, Kazakhstan, Belarus, Kyrgyzstan, Moldova,  Tajikistan, Turkmenistan, Uzbekistan (2001-2006), the United Kingdom, Ireland, Malta, Portugal (2009-2014), Denmark, Bulgaria, Romania, Turkey (2014-2019)  and also Permanent Secretary of State. He became first secretary in the foreign ministry in 1983 and subsequently served in the Icelandic embassy in Paris, as Deputy Permanent Representative to the Council of Europe, as Permanent Representative to the United Nations and other international organisations in Geneva, as chief negotiator for EFTA with Mexico and Chile and as Chairman of the WTO Committee on Least Developed Countries.

References

Living people
Benedikt Jonsson
Benedikt Jonsson
Benedikt Jonsson
Benedikt Jonsson
Benedikt Jonsson
Benedikt Jonsson
Benedikt Jonsson
Benedikt Jonsson
Benedikt Jonsson
Benedikt Jonsson
Benedikt Jonsson
Benedikt Jonsson
Benedikt Jonsson
Benedikt Jonsson
Benedikt Jonsson
Benedikt Jonsson
1954 births